Internationales Figurentheaterfestival is a theatre festival in Germany.

External links
 

Theatre festivals in Germany
Events in Bavaria
Culture of Bavaria
Middle Franconia